The 1973 Southern Miss Golden Eagles football team was an American football team that represented the University of Southern Mississippi as an independent during the 1973 NCAA Division I football season. In their fifth year under head coach P. W. Underwood, the team compiled a 6–4–1 record.

Schedule

References

Southern Miss
Southern Miss Golden Eagles football seasons
Southern Miss Golden Eagles football